Victoria Records was the name of record labels:

 Victoria Records (1952) - a Philadelphia, Pennsylvania-based company.
 Victoria Records (2000) - a Philadelphia, Pennsylvania-based company.
 Victoria Records (2015) - a Monterrey, Mexico-based company.

See also
 List of record labels